may refer to:
 Mount Hiba (Hiroshima), Japan
 Mount Hiba (Shimane), Japan